Oflag IV-D  Elsterhorst was a World War II German Army Prisoner-of-war camp for Allied officers located near Hoyerswerda, then part of Lower Silesia, 44 km north-east of Dresden.

Timeline 

 June 1940: part of Stalag IV-A was separated ou and made into an Oflag for Belgian, British, and French officers taken prisoner during the Battle of France. Also a separate part of the camp was set aside as a hospital for prisoners Reserve Lazarett 742.
 September 1943: many British Commonwealth officers from the North Africa campaign. that had been held in Italian prisoner of war camps were transferred to Oflag IV-D
 May 1945 the camp was liberated by the Red Army.

See also
List of German World War II POW camps

References

Sources 
  Elsterhorst camps in German

Oflags
Province of Lower Silesia